Alexander "Alex" Asberry (November 2, 1861 - abt. 1903) was a grocer, deacon, and  politician who served one term in the Texas Legislature. He was born in Wilderville, Texas in 1861, the son of William and Julia Asberry. He was educated at Hearne Academy and worked in the grocery business.

A Republican, he ran for a seat in the legislature in 1884 but lost. He was elected in 1888 to the Texas House of Representatives.  He was a delegate to the Republican National Convention in 1888 and 1892.  He ran again for the legislature in 1892, but was defeated.  He again ran for the legislature in 1896, and was narrowly defeated in a contested election.  He also served as a deacon in his church.  He died about 1903.

References
Texas Legislators: Past & Present - Alexander Asberry
Handbook of Texas Online - Alexander Asberry
Forever Free: Nineteenth Century African-American Legislators and Constitutional Convention Delegates of Texas

Republican Party members of the Texas House of Representatives
1861 births
1903 deaths
African-American state legislators in Texas
African-American politicians during the Reconstruction Era
People from Falls County, Texas
Grocers
People from Robertson County, Texas
20th-century African-American people